The 2003 Asian Judo Championships were held in Jeju, South Korea from 31 October to 1 November 2003.

Medal summary

Men

Women

Medal table

External links
 
 Result of the Asian Judo Championships (Judo Union of Asia)
 Daily Report of 2003 Jeju Asia Championships (International Judo Federation)

Asian Championships
Asian Judo Championships
Asian Judo Championships
Judo 2003
Judo competitions in South Korea